Frano Kršinić (born 23 August 1947) is a Croatian marine biologist.

Kršinić was born in Lumbarda, on the island of Korčula. He obtained his B.Sc., M.Sc. and Ph.D. degrees from the Faculty of Science, University of Zagreb.

Since 1972 he was employed at the Institute of Oceanography and Fisheries in Dubrovnik, where he was a head of the Laboratory of Plankton Ecology until his retirement in 2013. His research focus is plankton of the Adriatic Sea.

Kršinić is a full member of the Croatian Academy of Sciences and Arts since 2000. He is the chairman of the Academy's Scientific Council for Adriatic Research.

Sources
Frano Kršinić, F.C.A.
Frano Kršinić at the Ruđer Bošković Institute

External links
 

1947 births
Croatian biologists
Marine biologists
Members of the Croatian Academy of Sciences and Arts
Faculty of Science, University of Zagreb alumni
Living people
People from Lumbarda
Planktologists